HMS Sovereign may refer to the following English and Royal Navy warships: 

 , also known as HMS Sovereign, an English warship built in 1488, rebuilt in 1510, and in service until 1521
 , also known as HMS Sovereign, an English warship launched in 1637, renamed Royal Sovereign in 1660, and in service until 1696
 , a submarine in commission from 1974 to 2006
 , seven ships of the Royal Navy have been named HMS Royal Sovereign

Royal Navy ship names